The following is the final results of the 1965 World Wrestling Championships. Freestyle competition were held in Manchester, Great Britain and Greco-Roman competition were held in Tampere, Finland.

Medal table

Team ranking

Medal summary

Men's freestyle

Men's Greco-Roman

References
United World Wrestling Database

World Wrestling Championships
Wrestling in England
Wrestling
Wrestling 
World Wrestling Championships
World Wrestling Championships
International sports competitions in Manchester
World Wrestling Championships
World Wrestling Championships, 1965
World Wrestling Championships